The  was a class of minelayers of the Imperial Japanese Navy (IJN), serving during World War II. There were three sub-classes, as well.

Design
The Hastutaka-class minelayer was a reinforced model of the Shirataka. The Harima Zōsen Corporation dealt with all of the Hatsutaka-class.

Ships in classes

Hatsutaka-class
Project number was H12. First production model of the Hatsutaka-class. Two vessels were built in 1938-40 under the Maru 3 Programme (Ship # 7 - 8). They were equipped with 4 × 40 mm quick-firing guns for anti-submarine warfare.

Wakataka-class
Project number was H12B. Second production model of the Hatsutaka-class. Only 1 vessel was built under the Maru 4 Programme (Ship # 102). She was equipped with 2 ×  anti-aircraft cannons. The Wakataka was classed in the Hatsutaka-class in the IJN official documents. The IJN called her the  unofficially.

Asadori-class
Project number was H12C. The Navy Technical Department revised the Wakataka drawings. Only 1 vessel was planned under the Kai-Maru 5 Programme (Ship # 5039). The IJN called her the  unofficially.

Photos

Footnotes

See also
Japanese minelayer Shirataka

Bibliography
Ships of the World special issue Vol.47, Auxiliary Vessels of the Imperial Japanese Navy, (Japan), March 1997
Model Art Extra No.360, Drawings of Imperial Japanese Naval Vessels Part-2,  (Japan), October 1989
The Maru Special, Japanese Naval Vessels No.42, Japanese minelayers,  (Japan), August 1980
Daiji Katagiri, Ship Name Chronicles of the Imperial Japanese Navy Combined Fleet, Kōjinsha (Japan), June 1988, 

 
Mine warfare vessels of the Imperial Japanese Navy